Bussler is a German surname. Notable people with the surname include:

Ludwig Bussler (1838–1900), German musical instructor, critic and conductor
Patrick Bussler (born 1984), German snowboarder
Frederik Bussler (born 1999), German entrepreneur

German-language surnames